The Journal of Hindu-Christian Studies is an annual peer-reviewed academic journal that publishes articles and book reviews on Hindu-Christian issues. It was established in 1988 as Hindu-Christian Studies Bulletin and obtained its current name in 2004. It is abstracted and indexed in the ATLA Religion Database. It is published by the Society for Hindu-Christian Studies. The editor-in-chief is Gopal Gupta at the (Aurora University).

References

External links 
 
 Society for Hindu-Christian Studies
 

Annual journals
Academic journals published by learned and professional societies
Hindu studies journals
Christianity studies journals
Publications established in 1988
English-language journals